Macheirocera grandis is a species of ulidiid or picture-winged fly in the genus Macheirocera of the family Ulidiidae.

References

Ulidiidae
Insects described in 1869
Taxa named by Camillo Rondani